The 1992 Dutch Supercup, known as the PTT Telecom Cup for sponsorship reasons, was the third Supercup match in Dutch football. The game was played on 12 August 1992 at De Kuip in Rotterdam, between 1991–92 Eredivisie champions PSV Eindhoven and 1991–92 KNVB Cup winners Feyenoord. PSV won the match 1–0.

Match details

References

1992
Supercup
D
D
Dutch Supercup